Mary Fraser may refer to:

 Mary Crawford Fraser (1851–1922), American writer
 Mary Isabel Fraser (1863–1942), New Zealand school principal and educationalist